Birch Lake is a lake in Aitkin and Crow Wing counties, Minnesota, United States.

Birch Lake was named after two types of birch found there (Betula papyrifera and Betula alleghaniensis) from which Native Americans fashioned canoes.

See also
List of lakes in Minnesota

References

Lakes of Minnesota
Lakes of Aitkin County, Minnesota
Lakes of Crow Wing County, Minnesota